The Islamic Emirate of Badakhshan was an unrecognized Islamic state ruled by Sharia law in modern day Badakhshan Province, Afghanistan.

History 
The area was controlled by forces loyal to the Tajik leaders Burhanuddin Rabbani and Ahmad Shah Massoud during the 1990s, who were de facto the national government until 1996. Badakhshan was the only province which did not fall under Taliban control from 1996 to 2001. But during the war which was going on, an ethnic Tajik, Mawlawi Shariqi, established a non-Taliban Islamic emirate, by the Islamic Revolutionary State of Afghanistan in neighboring Nuristan. During the 2010s, Taliban insurgents attacked and took control of the province. The Islamic Emirate of Badakhshan was a Salafi Tajik state which was ruled by Sharia. It was established around the same time that the Islamic Emirate of Kunar and the IRSA were established, although "none of these states were able to grow by incorporating other areas and all three collapsed quickly".

See also 

 Islamic Revolutionary State of Afghanistan
 Islamic Emirate of Afghanistan (1996–2001)
 Islamic Emirate of Kunar
 Islamic Emirate of Byara

References

1990s in Afghanistan
Former countries in Asia
Former emirates
Former theocracies
Former unrecognized countries
Rebellions in Asia
Emirates
States and territories established in 1996
States and territories disestablished in 2001
1996 establishments in Asia
2001 disestablishments in Asia
Lists of former countries
Former countries in South Asia